Yo Sé Que Mentía was a 1982 soap opera produced by Puerto Rico's WAPA-TV.

It included Argentina's Daniel Guerrero, Puerto Rican singer and dancer Iris Chacón, a young Adamari López, Amneris Morales, Miguel Ángel Suárez and Ángela Meyer. It also included Ivette Rodriguez as "Fanny".

References

External links
quepasa.com

1982 telenovelas
1982 Puerto Rican television series endings
1982 Puerto Rican television series debuts
1980s Puerto Rican television series
Puerto Rican telenovelas
Spanish-language telenovelas
Puerto Rico in fiction